Sense and Sensibility is a novel by Jane Austen, published in 1811. It was published anonymously; By A Lady appears on the title page where the author's name might have been. It tells the story of the Dashwood sisters, Elinor (age 19) and Marianne (age 16½) as they come of age. They have an older half-brother, John, and a younger sister, Margaret (age 13).

The novel follows the three Dashwood sisters as they must move with their widowed mother from the estate on which they grew up, Norland Park. Because Norland is passed down to John, the product of Mr. Dashwood's first marriage, and his young son, the four Dashwood women need to look for a new home. They have the opportunity to rent a modest home, Barton Cottage, on the property of a distant relative, Sir John Middleton. There Elinor and Marianne experience love, romance, and heartbreak. The novel is set in South West England, London, and Sussex, probably between 1792 and 1797.

The novel, which sold out its first print run of 750 copies in the middle of 1813, marked a success for its author. It had a second print run later that year. It was the first Austen title to be republished in England after her death, and the first illustrated Austen book produced in Britain, in Richard Bentley's Standard Novels series of 1833. The novel has been in continuous publication since 1811, and has many times been illustrated, excerpted, abridged, and adapted for stage, film, and television.

Plot summary 
Henry Dashwood, his second wife, and their three daughters live for many years with Henry's wealthy bachelor uncle at Norland Park, a large country estate in Sussex. That uncle decides, in late life, to will the use and income only of his property first to Henry, then to Henry's first son (by his first marriage) John Dashwood, so that the property should pass intact to John's four-year-old son Harry. The uncle dies, but Henry lives just a year after that and he is unable in such short time to save enough money for the future security of his wife Mrs Dashwood, and their daughters, Elinor, Marianne, and Margaret, who are left only a small income. On his deathbed, Mr Henry Dashwood extracts a promise from his son John to take care of his half-sisters. But before Henry is long in the grave, John's greedy wife, Fanny, persuades her husband to renege on the promise, appealing to his concerns about diminishing his own son Harry's inheritance, despite the fact that John is already independently wealthy thanks to both his inheritance from his mother and his wife's dowry. Henry Dashwood's love for his second family is also used by Fanny to arouse her husband's jealousy, and persuade him not to help his sisters financially.

John and Fanny immediately move in as the new owners of Norland, where the Dashwood women are treated as unwelcome guests by a spiteful Fanny. Mrs Dashwood seeks somewhere else to live. In the meantime, Fanny's brother, Edward Ferrars, visits Norland and is attracted to Elinor. Fanny disapproves of their budding romance, and offends Mrs Dashwood by implying that Elinor must be motivated by his expectations of coming into money.

Mrs Dashwood moves her family to Barton Cottage in Devonshire, near the home of her cousin, Sir John Middleton. Their new home is modest, but they are warmly received by Sir John and welcomed into local society, meeting his wife, Lady Middleton; his mother-in-law, the garrulous but well-meaning Mrs Jennings; and his friend, Colonel Brandon. Colonel Brandon is attracted to Marianne, and Mrs Jennings teases them about it. Marianne is not pleased, as she considers the thirty-five-year-old Colonel Brandon an old bachelor, incapable of falling in love or inspiring love in anyone.

While out for a walk, Marianne gets caught in the rain, slips, and sprains her ankle. The dashing John Willoughby sees the accident and assists her, picking her up and carrying her back to her home. After this, Marianne quickly comes to admire his good looks and his similar tastes in poetry, music, art, and love. His attentions, and Marianne's behaviour, lead Elinor and Mrs Dashwood to suspect that the couple are secretly engaged. Elinor cautions Marianne against her unguarded conduct, but Marianne refuses to check her emotions. Willoughby engages in several intimate activities with Marianne, including taking her to see the home he expects to inherit one day and obtaining a lock of her hair. When the announcement of an engagement seems imminent, Willoughby instead informs the Dashwoods that his aunt, upon whom he is financially dependent due to his debts, is sending him to London on business, indefinitely. Marianne is distraught and abandons herself to her sorrow.

Edward Ferrars pays a short visit to Barton Cottage, but seems unhappy. Elinor fears that he no longer has feelings for her, but she will not show her heartache. After Edward departs, sisters Anne and Lucy Steele, vulgar cousins of Mrs. Jennings, come to stay at Barton Park. Lucy informs Elinor in confidence of her secret four-year engagement to Edward Ferrars that started when he was studying with her uncle, and she displays proof of their intimacy. Elinor realises that Lucy's visit and revelations are the result of her jealousy and cunning calculation, and it helps Elinor to understand Edward's recent sadness and behaviour towards her. She acquits Edward of blame and pities him for being held to a loveless engagement to Lucy by his sense of honour.

Elinor and Marianne accompany Mrs Jennings to London. On arriving, Marianne rashly writes several personal letters to Willoughby, which go unanswered. When they meet by chance at a dance, Willoughby is with another woman. He greets Marianne reluctantly and coldly, to her extreme distress. She leaves the party completely distraught. Soon Marianne receives a curt letter enclosing their former correspondence and love tokens, including the lock of her hair. Willoughby is revealed to be engaged to a young lady, Miss Grey, who has a large fortune. Marianne is devastated. After Elinor reads the letter, Marianne admits to Elinor that she and Willoughby were never engaged. She behaved as if they were because she knew she loved him and thought that he loved her.

As Marianne grieves, Colonel Brandon visits and reveals to Elinor that Willoughby seduced, impregnated, then abandoned Brandon's young ward, Miss Eliza Williams. Willoughby's aunt subsequently disinherited him, and so, in great personal debt, he chose to marry Miss Grey for her money. Eliza is the illegitimate daughter of Brandon's first love, also called Eliza, a young woman who was his father's ward and an heiress. She was forced into an unhappy marriage to Brandon's elder brother, in order to shore up the family's finances, and that marriage ended in scandal and divorce while Brandon was abroad with the Army. After Colonel Brandon's father and brother died, he inherited the family estate and returned to find Eliza dying in a pauper's home, so Brandon took charge of raising her young daughter. Brandon tells Elinor that Marianne strongly reminds him of the elder Eliza for her sincerity and sweet impulsiveness. Brandon removed the younger Eliza to the country, and reveals to Elinor all of these details in the hope that Marianne could get some consolation in discovering Willoughby's true character.

Meanwhile, the Steele sisters have come to London. After a brief acquaintance, they are asked to stay at John and Fanny Dashwood's London house. Lucy sees the invitation as a personal compliment, rather than what it is: a slight to Elinor and Marianne who, being family, should have received such an invitation first. Too talkative, Anne Steele betrays to Fanny Lucy's secret engagement to Edward Ferrars. As a result, the sisters are turned out of the house, and Edward is ordered by his wealthy mother to break off the engagement on pain of disinheritance. Edward, still sensitive of the dishonour of a broken engagement and how it would reflect poorly on Lucy Steele, refuses to comply. He is immediately disinherited in favour of his brother, Robert, which gains Edward respect for his conduct and sympathy from Elinor and Marianne. Colonel Brandon shows his admiration by offering Edward the clerical living of the Delaford parsonage, so to enable him to marry Lucy after he is ordained.

Mrs Jennings takes Elinor and Marianne to the country to visit her second daughter, Mrs. Charlotte Palmer, at her husband's estate, Cleveland, on their way back to their home in Devonshire. Marianne, still in misery over Willoughby's marriage, goes walking in the rain and becomes dangerously ill. She is diagnosed with putrid fever, and it is believed that her life is in danger. Elinor writes to Mrs. Dashwood to explain the gravity of the situation, and Colonel Brandon volunteers to go and bring Marianne's mother to Cleveland to be with her. In the night, Willoughby arrives and reveals to Elinor that his love for Marianne was genuine and that losing her has made him miserable. He elicits Elinor's pity because his choice has made him unhappy, but she is disgusted by the callous way in which he talks of Miss Williams and his own wife. He also reveals that his aunt said she would have forgiven him if he married Miss Williams but that he had refused.

Marianne recovers from her illness, and Elinor tells her of Willoughby's visit. Marianne realizes she could never have been happy with Willoughby's immoral, erratic, and inconsiderate ways. She values Elinor's more moderated conduct with Edward and resolves to model herself after her courage and good sense. Edward later arrives and reveals that, after his disinheritance, Lucy jilted him in favour of his now wealthy younger brother, Robert. Elinor is overjoyed. Edward and Elinor marry, and later Marianne marries Colonel Brandon, having gradually come to love him. The two couples live as neighbours, with sisters and husbands in harmony with each other. Willoughby considers Marianne as his ideal but the narrator tells the reader not to suppose that he was never happy.

Characters
Elinor Dashwood – the sensible and reserved eldest daughter of Mr and Mrs Henry Dashwood. She represents the "sense" half of Austen's title, although not exclusively. She is 19 years old at the beginning of the book. She becomes attached to Edward Ferrars, the brother-in-law of her elder half-brother, John. She sympathetically befriends Colonel Brandon, Marianne's long-suffering admirer and eventual husband. Always feeling a keen sense of responsibility to her family and friends, she places their welfare and interests above her own and suppresses her own strong emotions in a way that leads others to think she is indifferent or cold-hearted. Ever honourable, she feels she must not reveal Lucy Steele's secret engagement to Edward, even though it causes her great suffering. While the book's narrative style is 3rd person omniscient, it is Elinor's viewpoint that is primarily reflected. Thus, the description of most of the novel's characters and events reflects Elinor's thoughts and insights.
Marianne Dashwood – the romantically inclined and eagerly expressive second daughter of Mr and Mrs Henry Dashwood. Her emotional excesses identify her as the "sensibility" of the book's title, although again, not exclusively (at the time, "sensibility" meant driven primarily by one's emotions). She is 16 years old at the beginning of the book. She is the object of the attentions of Colonel Brandon and Mr Willoughby. She is attracted to young, handsome, romantically spirited Willoughby and does not think much of the older, more reserved Colonel Brandon. Marianne undergoes the most development within the book, learning that her sensibilities have been selfish. She decides that her conduct should be more like that of her elder sister, Elinor.
Edward Ferrars – the elder of Fanny Dashwood's two brothers. He forms an attachment to Elinor Dashwood. Years before meeting the Dashwoods, Ferrars proposed to Lucy Steele, the niece of his tutor. The engagement has been kept secret owing to the expectation that Ferrars' family would object to his marrying Miss Steele, who has no fortune. He is disowned by his mother on discovery of the engagement after refusing, out of a sense of duty, to give it up.
John Willoughby – a philandering nephew of a neighbour of the Middletons, a dashing figure who charms Marianne and shares her artistic and cultural sensibilities. It is generally presumed by many of their mutual acquaintances that he is engaged to marry Marianne (partly due to her own overly familiar actions); however, he abruptly ends his acquaintance with the family and leaves just when an engagement with Marianne seems imminent. It is later revealed that he becomes engaged to the wealthy Sophia Grey because of the ending of financial support from his aunt. He is also contrasted by Austen as being "a man resembling 'the hero of a favourite story'". 
Colonel Brandon – a close friend of Sir John Middleton. He is 35 years old at the beginning of the book. He falls in love with Marianne at first sight, as she reminds him of his father's ward, Eliza, whom he loved when he was young. He was prevented from marrying Eliza because his father was determined that she should marry Brandon's older brother. Brandon was sent into the military abroad to be away from her, and while he was gone, Eliza suffered numerous misfortunes, partly as a consequence of her unhappy marriage. She finally died penniless and disgraced, and with a "natural" (i.e., extramarital) daughter, also named Eliza, who becomes the ward of the Colonel. He is a very honourable friend to the Dashwoods, particularly Elinor, and offers Edward Ferrars a living after Edward is disowned by his mother.
 Henry Dashwood – a wealthy gentleman who dies at the beginning of the story. The terms on which he inherited his estate and his own death soon after prevent him from leaving anything of substance to his second wife and their children. He extracts a promise from John, his son by his first wife, to look after (meaning ensure the financial security of) his second wife and their three daughters.
 Mrs Dashwood – this name always refers to the second wife of Henry Dashwood. She is left in difficult financial straits by the death of her husband. She is 40 years old at the beginning of the book. Much like her daughter Marianne, she is very emotive and often makes poor decisions based on emotion rather than reason.
 Margaret Dashwood – the youngest daughter of Mr and Mrs Henry Dashwood. She is thirteen at the beginning of the book. She is also romantic and good-tempered but not expected to be as clever as her sisters when she grows older.
 John Dashwood – the son of Henry Dashwood by Henry's first wife. He initially intends to do well by his half-sisters, but he has a keen sense of avarice, and is easily swayed by his wife to ignore his deathbed promise to his father and leaves the Dashwood women in genteel poverty.
 Fanny Dashwood – the wife of John Dashwood, always referred to as "Mrs. John Dashwood" or "Fanny Dashwood" – not to conflict with "Mrs. Dashwood" (above) – and sister to Edward and Robert Ferrars. She is vain, selfish, and snobbish. She spoils her son Harry. She is very harsh to her husband's half-sisters and stepmother, especially since she fears her brother Edward is attached to Elinor.
 Sir John Middleton – a distant relative of Mrs Dashwood who, after the death of Henry Dashwood, invites her and her three daughters to live in a cottage on his property. Described as a wealthy, sporting man who served in the army with Colonel Brandon, he is very affable and keen to throw frequent parties, picnics, and other social gatherings to bring together the young people in the area. He and his mother-in-law, Mrs Jennings, make a jolly, teasing, and gossipy pair with no sense of how their meddling embarrasses others.
 Lady Middleton – the genteel, but reserved wife of Sir John Middleton, she is quieter than her husband, and is primarily concerned with mothering her four spoiled children.
 Mrs Jennings – mother to Lady Middleton and Charlotte Palmer. A widow who has married off all her children, she spends most of her time visiting her daughters and their families, especially the Middletons. She and her son-in-law, Sir John Middleton, take an active interest in the romantic affairs of the young people around them and seek to encourage suitable matches, often to the particular chagrin of Elinor and Marianne.
 Robert Ferrars – the shallow younger brother of Edward Ferrars and Fanny Dashwood, he is most concerned about status, fashion, and his new barouche. He subsequently marries Miss Lucy Steele after Edward is disinherited.
 Mrs Ferrars – Fanny Dashwood and Edward and Robert Ferrars' mother. She is a bad-tempered, unsympathetic woman. She is determined that her sons should marry well. She disowns her eldest son for his engagement to Lucy Steele but her youngest son later marries the very same woman.
 Charlotte Palmer – the daughter of Mrs Jennings and the younger sister of Lady Middleton, Mrs Palmer is pleasant and friendly but quite silly, and laughs at inappropriate things, such as her husband's continual rudeness to her and to others.
 Thomas Palmer – the husband of Charlotte Palmer who is running for a seat in Parliament, but is idle, sarcastic and often rude. While obviously bored with and barely tolerant of his silly wife, he is more considerate toward the Dashwood sisters.
 Lucy Steele – (never called "Miss Steele") a young, distant relation of Mrs Jennings, who has for some time been secretly engaged to Edward Ferrars. She assiduously cultivates the friendship of Elinor Dashwood and her mother. Attractive but limited in formal education and financial means, she affects affable innocence but is actually manipulative and scheming.
 Anne "Nancy" Steele – (often called "Miss Steele") Lucy Steele's elder, socially inept, and less clever sister.
 Mr Harris – an apothecary who treats Marianne when she falls ill at Cleveland.
 Miss Sophia Grey – a wealthy heiress whom Mr Willoughby marries to retain his expensive lifestyle after he is disinherited by his aunt.
 Miss Morton – wealthy daughter of Lord Morton – whom Mrs Ferrars wants her eldest son, Edward, and later Robert, to marry.
 Mr Pratt – an uncle of Lucy Steele and Edward's tutor.
 Eliza Williams (Jr.) (daughter) – the ward of Col. Brandon, she is about 15 years old and bore an illegitimate child to John Willoughby. She has the same name as her mother.
 Eliza Williams (Sr.) (mother) – the former love interest of Colonel Brandon. Williams was Brandon's father's ward, and was forced by him to marry Brandon's older brother. The marriage was an unhappy one, and it is revealed that her daughter was left as Colonel Brandon's ward when he found his lost love dying in a poorhouse.
 Mrs Smith – the wealthy aunt of Mr Willoughby who disowns him for seducing and abandoning the young Eliza Williams, Col. Brandon's ward.

Development of the novel
Jane Austen wrote the first draft of the novel in the form of a novel-in-letters (epistolary form) perhaps as early as 1795 when she was about 19 years old, or 1797, at age 21, and is said to have given it the title Elinor and Marianne. She later changed the form to a narrative and the title to Sense and Sensibility.

Austen drew inspiration for Sense and Sensibility from other novels of the 1790s that treated similar themes, including Adam Stevenson's Life and Love (1785) which he had written about himself and a relationship that was not meant to be. Jane West's A Gossip's Story (1796), which features one sister full of rational sense and another sister of romantic, emotive sensibility, is considered to have been an inspiration as well. West's romantic sister-heroine also shares her first name, Marianne, with Austen's. There are further textual similarities, described in a modern edition of West's novel.

Austen may have drawn on her knowledge of Warren Hastings, the first Governor-General of India, in her portrayal of Colonel Brandon. Hastings had been rumoured to be the biological father of Austen's cousin Eliza de Feuillide. Linda Robinson Walker argues that Hastings "haunts Sense and Sensibility in the character of Colonel Brandon": both left for India at the age of seventeen; Hastings may have had an illegitimate daughter named Eliza; both Hastings and Brandon participated in a duel.

Title
"Sense" means good judgment, wisdom, or prudence, and "sensibility" means sensitivity, sympathy, or emotionality. Elinor is described as a character with great "sense" (although Marianne, too, is described as having sense), and Marianne is identified as having a great deal of "sensibility" (although Elinor, too, feels deeply, without expressing it as openly). By changing the title, Austen added "philosophical depth" to what began as a sketch of two characters.

Critical views 
Sense and Sensibility, much like Austen's other fiction, has attracted a large body of criticism from many different approaches. Early reviews of Sense and Sensibility focused on the novel as providing lessons in conduct (which would be debated by many later critics), as well as reviewing the characters. The Norton Critical Edition of Sense and Sensibility, edited by Claudia Johnson, contains a number of reprinted early reviews in its supplementary material. An "Unsigned Review" in the February 1812 Critical Review praises Sense and Sensibility as well-written with well-supported and -drawn characters, realistic, and with a "highly pleasing" plot in which "the whole is just long enough to interest the reader without fatiguing." This review praises Mrs. Dashwood, the mother of the Dashwood sisters, as well as Elinor, and claims that Marianne's extreme sensibility makes her miserable. It claims that Sense and Sensibility has a lesson and moral which is made clear through the plot and the characters. Another "Unsigned Review" from the May 1812 British Critic further emphasizes the novel's function as a type of conduct book. In this author's opinion, Austen's favouring of Elinor's temperament over Marianne's provides the lesson. The review claims that "the object of the work is to represent the effects on the conduct of life, of discreet quiet good sense on the one hand, and an overrefined and excessive susceptibility on the other." The review states that Sense and Sensibility contains "many sober and salutary maxims for the conduct of life" within a "very pleasing and entertaining narrative." W. F. Pollock's 1861 review from Frasier's Magazine, titled "British Novelists," becomes what editor Claudia Johnson terms an "early example of what would become the customary view of Sense and Sensibility." In addition to emphasizing the novel's morality, Pollock reviews the characters in catalogue-like fashion, praising and criticizing them in according to the notion that Austen favours Elinor's point of view and temperament. Pollock even praises Sir John Middleton and Mrs. Jennings, and comments on the humour of Mr. Palmer and his "silly wife." Pollock criticizes Sir John Dashwood's selfishness without mentioning Fanny's influence upon them. He also criticizes the Steele sisters for their vulgarity.

An anonymous piece titled "Miss Austen" published in 1866 in The Englishwoman's Domestic Magazine departs from other early criticism in its sympathizing with Marianne over Elinor, claiming that Elinor is "too good" a character. The article also differs from other reviews in that it claims that the "prevailing merit" of the book is not in its sketch of the two sisters; rather, the book is effective because of its "excellent treatment of the subordinate characters." Alice Meynell's 1894 article "The Classic Novelist" in the Pall Mall Gazette also concurs with Austen's attention to small things. Meynell claims that Austen deals in lesser characters and small matters because "that which makes life, art, and work trivial is a triviality of relations." In her attention to secondary characters, Meynell discusses the children's function to "illustrate the folly of their mothers," especially Lady Middleton.

Austen biographer Claire Tomalin argues that Sense and Sensibility has a "wobble in its approach", which developed because Austen, in the course of writing the novel, gradually became less certain about whether sense or sensibility should triumph. Austen characterises Marianne as a sweet person with attractive qualities: intelligence, musical talent, frankness, and the capacity to love deeply. She also acknowledges that Willoughby, with all his faults, continues to love and, in some measure, appreciate Marianne. For these reasons, some readers find Marianne's ultimate marriage to Colonel Brandon an unsatisfactory ending.

The Dashwood sisters stand apart as being virtually the only characters capable of intelligent thought and any sort of deep thinking. Brownstein wrote that the differences between the Dashwood sisters have been exaggerated, and in fact the sisters are more alike than they are different, with Elinor having an "excellent heart" and being capable of the same romantic passions as Marianne feels, while Marianne has much sense as well. Elinor is more reserved, more polite, and less impulsive than Marianne who loves poetry, taking walks across picturesque landscapes and believes in intense romantic relationships, but it is this very closeness between the sisters that allows these differences to emerge during their exchanges.

Many critics explore Sense and Sensibility in relation to authors and genres popular during Austen's time. One of the most popular forms of fiction in Austen's time was epistolary fiction. This is a style of writing in which all of the action, dialogue, and character interactions are reflected through letters sent from one or more of the characters. In her book Romantic Correspondence: Women, Politics, and the Fiction of Letters, Mary Favret explores Austen's fraught relationship with epistolary fiction, claiming that Austen "wrestled with epistolary form" in previous writings and, with the publication of Sense and Sensibility, "announced her victory over the constraints of the letter." Favret contends that Austen's version of the letter separates her from her "admired predecessor, Samuel Richardson" in that Austen's letters are "a misleading guide to the human heart which, in the best instances, is always changing and adapting." According to Favret, the character of Elinor Dashwood is an "anti-epistolary heroine" whose "inner world" of thoughts and feelings does not find "direct expression in the novel, although her point of view controls the story." Sense and Sensibility establishes what Favret calls a "new privacy" in the novel, which was constrained by previous notions of the romance of letters. This new privacy is a "less constraining mode of narration" in which Austen's narrator provides commentary on the action, rather than the characters themselves through the letters. Favret claims that in Sense and Sensibility, Austen wants to "recontextualize" the letter and bring it into a "new realism." Austen does so by imbuing the letter with dangerous power when Marianne writes to Willoughby; both their love and the letter "prove false." Additionally, Favret claims that Austen uses both of the sisters' letter writing to emphasize the contrasts in their personalities. When both of the sisters write letters upon arriving in London, Elinor's letter is the "dutiful letter of the 'sensible sister'" and Marianne writes a "vaguely illicit letter" reflecting her characterization as the "sensitive" sister. What is perhaps most striking about Favret's analysis is that she notes that the lovers who write to one another never unite with each other.

A common theme of Austen criticism has been on the legal aspects of society and the family, particularly wills, the rights of first and second sons, and lines of inheritance. Gene Ruoff's book Jane Austen's Sense and Sensibility explores these issues in a book-length discussion of the novel. Ruoff's first two chapters deal extensively with the subject of wills and the discourse of inheritance. These topics reveal what Ruoff calls "the cultural fixation on priority of male birth." According to Ruoff, male birth is by far the dominant issue in these legal conversations. Ruoff observes that, within the linear family, the order of male birth decides issues of eligibility and merit. When Robert Ferrars becomes his mother's heir, Edward is no longer appealing to his "opportunistic" fiancée Lucy, who quickly turns her attention to the foppish Robert and "entraps him" in order to secure the inheritance for herself. According to Ruoff, Lucy is specifically aiming for the heir because of the monetary advantage. William Galperin, in his book The History Austen, comments on the tendency of this system of patriarchal inheritance and earning as working to ensure the vulnerability of women. Because of this vulnerability, Galperin contends that Sense and Sensibility shows marriage as the only practical solution "against the insecurity of remaining an unmarried woman."

Feminist critics have long been engaged in conversations about Jane Austen, and Sense and Sensibility has figured in these discussions, especially about the patriarchal system of inheritance and earning. Sandra M. Gilbert and Susan Gubar's seminal feminist work The Madwoman in the Attic: The Woman Writer and the Nineteenth-Century Imagination contains several discussions of Sense and Sensibility. Gilbert and Gubar read the beginning of Sense and Sensibility as a retelling of King Lear from a female perspective and contend that these "reversals imply that male traditions need to be evaluated and reinterpreted from a female perspective." Gilbert and Gubar argue that Austen explores the effects of patriarchal control on women, particularly in the spheres of employment and inheritance. In Sense and Sensibility they educe the fact that Mr. John Dashwood sends his stepmother and half sisters from their home as well as promised income, as an instance of these effects. They also point to the "despised" Mrs. Ferrars's tampering with the patriarchal line of inheritance in her disowning of her elder son, Edward Ferrars, as proof that this construction is ultimately arbitrary. Gilbert and Gubar contend that while Sense and Sensibility'''s ultimate message is that "young women like Marianne and Elinor must submit to powerful conventions of society by finding a male protector," women such as Mrs. Ferrars and Lucy Steele demonstrate how women can "themselves become agents of repression, manipulators of conventions, and survivors." In order to protect themselves and their own interests, Mrs. Ferrars and Lucy Steele must participate in the same patriarchal system that oppresses them.

In the chapter "Sense and Sensibility: Opinions Too Common and Too Dangerous" from her book Jane Austen: Women, Politics, and the Novel, Claudia Johnson also gives a feminist reading of Sense and Sensibility. She differs from previous critics, especially the earliest ones, in her contention that Sense and Sensibility is not, as it is often assumed to be, a "dramatized conduct book" that values "female prudence" (associated with Elinor's sense) over "female impetuosity" (associated with Marianne's sensibility). Rather, Johnson sees Sense and Sensibility as a "dark and disenchanted novel" that views "institutions of order" such as property, marriage, and family in a negative light, an attitude that makes the novel the "most attuned to social criticism" of Austen's works. According to Johnson, Sense and Sensibility critically examines the codes of propriety as well as their enforcement by the community. Key to Austen's criticism of society, per Johnson's argument, is the depiction of the unfair marginalization of women resulting from the "death or simple absence of male protectors." Additionally, the male characters in Sense and Sensibility are depicted unfavourably. Johnson calls the gentlemen in Sense and Sensibility "uncommitted sorts" who "move on, more or less unencumbered, by human wreckage from the past." In other words, the men do not feel a responsibility to anyone else. Johnson compares Edward to Willoughby in this regard, claiming that all of the differences between them as individuals do not hide the fact that their failures are actually identical; Johnson calls them both "weak, duplicitous, and selfish," lacking the honesty and forthrightness with which Austen endows other "exemplary gentlemen" in her work. Johnson's comparison of Edward and Willoughby reveals the depressing picture about gentlemen presented in the novel.

Mary Poovey's analysis in The Proper Lady and the Woman Writer: Ideology as Style in the Works of Mary Wollstonecraft, Mary Shelley and Jane Austen concurs with Johnson's on the dark tone of Sense and Sensibility. Poovey contends that Sense and Sensibility has a "somber tone" in which conflict breaks out between Austen's engagement with her "self-assertive characters" and the moral codes necessary to control their potentially "anarchic" desires. Austen shows, according to Poovey, this conflict between individual desire and the restraint of moral principles through the character of Elinor herself. Except for Elinor, all of the female characters in Sense and Sensibility experience some kind of female excess. Poovey argues that while Austen does recognize "the limitations of social institutions," she demonstrates the necessity of controlling the "dangerous excesses of female feeling" rather than liberating them. She does so by demonstrating that Elinor's self-denial, especially in her keeping of Lucy Steele's secret and willingness to help Edward, even though both of these actions were hurtful to her, ultimately contribute to her own contentment and that of others. In this way, Poovey contends that Austen suggests that the submission to society that Elinor demonstrates is the proper way to achieve happiness in life.Sense and Sensibility criticism also includes ecocritical approaches. Susan Rowland's article "The 'Real Work': Ecocritical Alchemy and Jane Austen's Sense and Sensibility" studies the effects of alienation upon Edward Ferrars. Edward is alienated from society because he lacks what Rowland calls "useful employment." According to Rowland, Edward's condition represents problems with the history of work in Western industrialised societies. Edward's alienation from work also represents "the culture evolution of work" as a "progressive estrangement from nonhuman nature." Rowland argues that human culture estranges people from nature rather than returning them to it. Marianne also suffers from this estrangement of nature as she is ripped from her childhood home where she enjoyed walking the grounds and looking at trees. Rowland thus connects both Edward's and Marianne's progressive discomfort throughout the novel to their alienation from nature.

Publication history

In 1811, Thomas Egerton of the Military Library publishing house in London accepted the manuscript for publication in three volumes. Austen paid to have the book published and paid the publisher a commission on sales. The cost of publication was more than a third of Austen's annual household income of £460 (about £15,000 in 2008 currency). She made a profit of £140 (almost £5,000 in 2008 currency) on the first edition, which sold all 750 printed copies by July 1813. A second edition was advertised in October 1813.

The novel has been in continuous publication through to the 21st century as popular and critical appreciation of all the novels by Jane Austen slowly grew. The novel was translated into French by Madame Isabelle de Montolieu as Raison et Sensibilité. Montolieu had only the most basic knowledge of English, and her translations were more of "imitations" of Austen's novels as Montolieu had her assistants provide a summary of Austen's novels, which she then translated into an embellished French that often radically altered Austen's plots and characters. The "translation" of Sense and Sensibility by Montolieu changes entire scenes and characters, for example having Marianne call Willoughby an "angel" and an "Adonis" upon first meeting him, lines that are not in the English original. Likewise, the scene where Mrs Dashwood criticises her husband for planning to subsidise his widowed stepmother might be disadvantageous to "our little Harry", Mrs Dashwood soon forgets about Harry and it is made apparent her objections are founded in greed; Montolieu altered the scene by having Mrs Dashwood continuing to speak of "our little Harry" as the basis of her objections, completely changing her motives. When Elinor learns the Ferrars who married Lucy Steele is Robert, not Edward, Montolieu adds in a scene where Edward, the Dashwood sisters and their mother all break down in tears while clasping hands that was not in the original. Austen has the marriage of Robert Ferrars and Lucy Steele end well while Montolieu changes the marriage into a failure.

Adaptations
Screen
1971: This adaptation for BBC television was dramatized by Denis Constanduros and directed by David Giles.
1981: This seven-episode TV series was directed by Rodney Bennett.
1995: This theatrical release was adapted by Emma Thompson and directed by Ang Lee.
2000: A Tamil version titled Kandukondain Kandukondain stars Mammootty (Colonel Brandon), Ajith Kumar (Edward Ferrars), Tabu (Elinor), Aishwarya Rai (Marianne), and Abbas (John Willoughby).
2008: This three-episode BBC TV series was adapted by Andrew Davies and directed by John Alexander.

Radio
In 2013, Helen Edmundson adapted Sense and Sensibility for BBC Radio 4.

Stage
2013: Sense & Sensibility, the Musical (book and lyrics by Jeffrey Haddow and music by Neal Hampton) received its world premiere by the Denver Center Theatre Company in April 2013, as staged by Tony-nominated director Marcia Milgrom Dodge.
2014: The Utah Shakespeare Festival presented Joseph Hanreddy and J.R. Sullivan's adaptation.
2016: The Bedlam theatrical troupe mounted a well-received minimalist production that was adapted by Kate Hamill and directed by Eric Tucker, from a repertory run in 2014.

Literature
In 2013, author Joanna Trollope published Sense & Sensibility: A Novel as a part of series called The Austen Project by the publisher, bringing the characters into the present day and providing modern satire.
2009: Sense and Sensibility and Sea Monsters is a mashup parody novel by Ben H. Winters, with Jane Austen credited as co-author.
2016: Manga Classics: Sense and Sensibility published by UDON Entertainment's Manga Classics imprint was published in August 2016.

References

External links

 
 
 
 
Map of locations in Sense and Sensibility''

 
1811 British novels
British novels adapted into films
Novels by Jane Austen
Novels set in Devon
Novels set in Sussex
Works published under a pseudonym
British novels adapted into plays
Novels about nobility
British novels adapted into television shows
Novels adapted into comics
1811 debut novels